Robert Dent Millman (May 17, 1903 – March 19, 1963) was a professional football player from Cumberland, Maryland.  Millman attended Lafayette College and made his debut in the National Football League in 1925 with the Pottsville Maroons and played with the team for three seasons. During his rookie year, Millman helped the Maroons win the NFL championship before a disputed rules violation stripped the title from the team.

References

1903 births
Lafayette Leopards football players
Pottsville Maroons players
Players of American football from Maryland
1963 deaths
Sportspeople from Cumberland, Maryland
American football halfbacks